Nicolas Mahut was the defending champion, but chose not to defend his title.

Alexandre Sidorenko won the title, defeating Igor Sijsling 2–6, 6–3, 7–6(7–3) in the final.

Seeds

Draw

Finals

Top half

Bottom half

References
 Main Draw
 Qualifying Draw

Open Harmonie mutuelle - Singles
Saint-Brieuc Challenger